Chuluncayani Adventist University, named in Spanish as Universidad Chuluncayani Adventista, is a small private university near the city of Puno on the edge of Lake Titicaca, a major tourist destination of Peru. The university is affiliated with the Seventh-day Adventist Church, being one of two Adventist universities in Peru. It is a part of the Seventh-day Adventist education system, the world's second largest Christian school system.

See also

 List of Seventh-day Adventist colleges and universities

References

Universities and colleges affiliated with the Seventh-day Adventist Church
Universities in Peru